Brachypteryx is a genus of passerine birds in the family Muscicapidae containing ten species known as shortwings, that occurs in southeast Asia.

Shortwings are small birds with long legs, finely pointed bills, short tails and short rounded wings. They are shy elusive ground-dwellers that generally prefer the cover of dense undergrowth.

The genus Brachypteryx was introduced by the American naturalist Thomas Horsfield in 1821. The word comes from the classical Greek brakhus mean "short" and pterux meaning "wing". The genus was previously placed in the thrush family Turdidae but in 2010 two separate molecular phylogenetic studies found that species in the genus were more closely related to members of the Old World flycatcher family Muscicapidae.

The genus contains the following ten species:

 Rusty-bellied shortwing, Brachypteryx hyperythra
 Lesser shortwing, Brachypteryx leucophris
 Himalayan shortwing, Brachypteryx cruralis
 Chinese shortwing, Brachypteryx sinensis
 Taiwan shortwing, Brachypteryx goodfellowi
 Philippine shortwing, Brachypteryx poliogyna – split from B. montana
 Bornean shortwing, Brachypteryx erythrogyna – split from B. montana
 Javan shortwing, Brachypteryx montana – formerly the white-browed shortwing
 Flores shortwing, Brachypteryx floris – split from B. montana

Whilst the Javan and rusty-bellied shortwings show strong sexual plumage dimorphism, the lesser shortwing is sexually monomorphic.

Three other species were formerly placed in Brachypteryx:

 Great shortwing, Heinrichia calligyna
 Nilgiri blue robin or Nilgiri shortwing Myiomela major
 Gould's shortwing, Heteroxenicus stellata

References

 
Muscicapidae
Bird genera
 
Taxa named by Thomas Horsfield